Publius Claudius Pulcher was son of Appius Claudius Pulcher (consul 212 BC) and brother of Appius Claudius Pulcher (consul 185 BC). In 189 BC, he was curule aedile, and in 188 BC praetor. He was elected to the consulship through the devices of his brother in 184 BC, and in 181 BC he was one of the three commissioners appointed for planting a colony at Graviscae, a city on the coast of Etruria between Cosa and Castrum Novum.

Notes

References 
This entry incorporates public domain text originally from:
 William Smith (ed.), Dictionary of Greek and Roman Biography and Mythology, 1870.

2nd-century BC Roman consuls
2nd-century BC Roman praetors
Curule aediles
Publius consul 570 AUC